Jumanji: Welcome to the Jungle – Original Motion Picture Soundtrack is the film score to the 2017 film of the same name, written and composed by British composer Henry Jackman. The soundtrack was released digitally on 15 December 2017 through Sony Masterworks. A limited edition Vinyl which consisted of 300 copies was released on May 5, 2018. The score was nominated for the 2018 IFMCA Award for Best Original Score for an Action/Adventure/Thriller Film.

Background
James Newton Howard was originally attached to the film as composer. However, Henry Jackman took over scoring duties after the film's post-production schedule was pushed back 6 months which made Newton Howard unavailable.

The score was recorded at the Barbra Streisand Scoring Stage and conducted by Nick Glennie-Smith and Stephen Coleman. Halli Cauthery and Paul Mounsey provided additional music.

Track listing

Songs not included in the soundtrack, but featured in the film include the following:
 "Rollercoaster" by Bleachers 
 "Break Out" by Jordyn Kane 
 "Baby, I Love Your Way" by Big Mountain - Plays when Ruby Roundhouse does her dance fighting
 "Welcome to the Jungle" by Guns N' Roses - Plays in the end credits.

References

External links

2010s film soundtrack albums
2017 soundtrack albums
Henry Jackman soundtracks
Jumanji
Sony Music soundtracks